Beatrice Lungu (born 23 November 1956) is a Zambian sprinter. She competed in the women's 100 metres at the 1972 Summer Olympics.

References

1956 births
Living people
Athletes (track and field) at the 1972 Summer Olympics
Zambian female sprinters
Olympic athletes of Zambia
Place of birth missing (living people)
Olympic female sprinters